Abdul Zahir Tanin (born 1 May 1956) is an Afghan diplomat who has served as the Special Representative of the Secretary-General for Kosovo, making him Head of the UN Interim Administration Mission in Kosovo (UNMIK), since October 2015.

Early career
Tanin graduated from Kabul Medical University in 1980. The same year, he began working as a journalist in Kabul. He was editor-in-chief of Akhbar-e-Haftah and Sabawoon Magazine until 1992, and was also vice president of the Journalists' Union of Afghanistan from 1987 to 1992. From 1992 to 1993, he was a freelance writer in France.

He became a research fellow in international relations at the London School of Economics, working there from 1994 to 1996. He then worked for eleven years at the BBC World Service. He was a producer from 1995 to 2001, and then an editor until 2006; for Afghanistan and Central Asia until 2003, and then for Afghanistan in the Persian/Pashto section until 2006.

United Nations
In December 2006, Tanin was appointed as the Permanent Representative to the United Nations for the Islamic Republic of Afghanistan. As Permanent Representative of Afghanistan, Tanin participated in meetings of the UN General Assembly as a member of his country's delegation and delivered statements on behalf of the Government of Afghanistan in the UN Security Council, UN General Assembly, and other events and panels both within and outside of the UN.

Tanin traveled to meetings around the world to represent his country, including the Rio +20 conference in June 2012, the 4th UN Conference on Least Developed Countries in Istanbul in June 2011, and as head of delegation in LDC conferences in Lisbon in 2010, in Delhi in 2011, and the Non-Aligned Movement Ministerial Meeting in Cuba in 2009. Tanin also served as a Vice-president of the 63rd and 65th Sessions of the General Assembly, and during the 67th session on behalf of the Asian Group, and as acting president.

Tanin was appointed Vice-Chair of the Open-ended Working Group and Chair of the Intergovernmental Negotiations (IGN) on Security Council Reform during the 63rd General Assembly in 2008.  He was reappointed to chair the ongoing negotiations during the 64th, 65th, 66th, 67th and 68th sessions. In this capacity he spoke at conferences, including Brazil and Rome in 2009, the Global Governance and Security Council Reform conference also in Rome, and the Doha Forum in May 2011.

On behalf of Afghanistan, Tanin became a Vice Chair of the Committee on the Exercise of the Inalienable Rights of the Palestinian People in 2006, and chaired or attended meetings around the world.

Publications
 The Communist Regime in Afghanistan, published in Europe Asia Studies: a study of the political and social changes in Afghanistan from 1978 to 1992.
 Afghanistan in the Twentieth Century.
 The Oral History of Afghanistan in the 20th Century, a 29-part program broadcast by the BBC.
 Afghanistan on the World Stage, collected articles from December 2006 to September 2009.

Personal life
Tanin is married to Dr Zarghoona Tanin and they have two children.

See also
List of Permanent Representatives to the United Nations

External links
 Website of Permanent Mission of Afghanistan to the UN
 Guardian newspaper: Don't forget to reform the UN, by Z Tanin, 7 April 2009
 Interview of Zahir Tanin by Linda Fasulo (video)
 Opinion article of Tanin in the New York Times
 Afghanistan on the world stage. Statements, addresses and articles by Zahir Tanin.

References

1956 births
Living people
Permanent Representatives of Afghanistan to the United Nations
Special Representatives of the Secretary-General of the United Nations